Rodrigo Pereira Possebon (born 13 February 1989) is a professional footballer who last played as a midfielder for V.League 1 side Hồ Chí Minh City.

A box-to-box midfielder, as a youth, he played for Internacional in Brazil. He was spotted and signed by Manchester United in 2008. After two unsuccessful years with Manchester United which saw him only making 3 league appearances, he went on loan to Braga of Portugal for the first half of the 2009–10 season. He has since joined various clubs before joining Hồ Chí Minh City in 2018. Due to his ancestry, he was chosen to play for the Italy under-20s, playing one match for them in 2009.

Career

Club career

Early career
Born in Sapucaia do Sul, Rio Grande do Sul, Possebon began his football career playing for Internacional in a defensive midfield role. Possebon was spotted by Manchester United's Brazil-based scout, John Calvert-Toulmin, while following up the club's interest in twin full backs, Fábio and Rafael da Silva.

Manchester United
Manchester United signed Possebon in January 2008, and since his father is of Italian descent, Possebon qualified for an Italian passport, and so was not subject to European Union legislation regarding non-Europeans working in Europe. Possebon was allocated the number 34 shirt, which was vacated by Ryan Shawcross, for the remainder of the 2007–08 Premier League season. He made his professional debut for the club as a substitute, coming on for Ryan Giggs during the second half of the 1–1 draw with Newcastle United on 17 August.

On 23 September 2008, during a Football League Cup match, he was injured in a challenge by Middlesbrough captain Emanuel Pogatetz, for which the Austrian player received a straight red card. It was initially feared that he had broken his leg, but Manchester United later confirmed otherwise. Possebon made his return from injury on 22 October 2008, scoring in the Manchester United Reserves' 3–0 win over Manchester City.

Possebon made his FA Cup debut on 13 February 2009, coming on as a 72nd-minute substitute for Cristiano Ronaldo in a Fifth Round fixture with Derby County. On 1 March 2009, Possebon won his second trophy in English football after he was part of the Manchester United squad that beat Tottenham Hotspur 4–1 on penalties after the 2009 League Cup final finished goalless. He had previously been part of the team that captured the 2008 FA Community Shield.

Possebon joined Braga on loan, initially for the entire duration of the 2009–10 season. However, after falling out of favour, he returned to Old Trafford in January, after making just one appearance for the club.

Santos
On 19 August 2010, Santos announced that they had agreed terms with Possebon for his transfer from Manchester United. The two teams were still negotiating the fee for the transfer, but an announcement by Manchester United indicated that the transfer would be completed by the following day.

Possebon made his Santos debut in an away draw against Atlético Mineiro.

Later career
After leaving Santos, Possebon had unsuccessful spells with five different clubs in two years before taking a further two years out of the game. He followed his departure from Santos with a short spell with Italian club Vicenza, he didn't make an appearance before returning to Brazil to join Criciúma where he made 9 appearances. After a stint with Mirassol, Possebon joined Juventude and made just 7 appearances for the team before leaving. Before his break from football, he played seven times for Náutico in 2014. In 2016, two years later, Possebon officially signed for URT. He made his debut on 14 February in a 2–1 away win against Boa in the 2016 Campeonato Mineiro. He went on to make 7 appearances in total for URT in the Campeonato Mineiro as his side qualified for the semi-finals before being eliminated by Atlético Mineiro.

In 2017, Possebon joined Passo Fundo. He played eight times for the club during the 2017 Campeonato Gaúcho as they were relegated down to Série A2. On 7 January 2018, Possebon signed a contract with Hồ Chí Minh City in Vietnam. He was released a month later, on 22 February 2018, before the league season started after failing to impress.

International career
Although he was born in Brazil, Possebon was eligible for an Italian passport due to his father's ancestry. He applied for an Italian passport when signing for Manchester United, in order to avoid work permit legislation for non-EU citizens working in the United Kingdom. Following a relatively successful first season with Manchester United, Possebon received a call-up from Italy under-20 coach Francesco Rocca for the penultimate match of the 2008–09 Four Nations tournament against Germany on 22 April 2009.

Career statistics

Statistics accurate as of 15 April 2018.

Honours

Club

Internacional
U-20 Brazilian Championship (1): 2006

Manchester United
FA Community Shield (1): 2008
Football League Cup (1): 2008–09

Santos
Campeonato Paulista (1): 2011
Copa Libertadores (1): 2011

References

External links

1989 births
Living people
Sportspeople from Rio Grande do Sul
Brazilian people of Italian descent
Italian footballers
Italy youth international footballers
Brazilian footballers
Brazilian expatriate footballers
Association football midfielders
Sport Club Internacional players
Manchester United F.C. players
S.C. Braga players
Santos FC players
Criciúma Esporte Clube players
Mirassol Futebol Clube players
Esporte Clube Juventude players
Clube Náutico Capibaribe players
União Recreativa dos Trabalhadores players
Esporte Clube Passo Fundo players
V.League 1 players
Campeonato Brasileiro Série A players
Premier League players
Expatriate footballers in England
Expatriate footballers in Portugal
Brazilian expatriate sportspeople in England
Italian expatriate sportspeople in England